The 2019 Michigan Wolverines baseball team represented the University of Michigan in the 2019 NCAA Division I baseball season. The Wolverines, led by head coach Erik Bakich in his seventh season, were a member of the Big Ten Conference and played their home games at Wilpon Baseball Complex in Ann Arbor, Michigan. The Wolverines finished the season with a 50–22 record, including 16–7 in conference play, marking their first 50 win season since 1987.

The Wolverines received an at-large bid to the 2019 NCAA Division I baseball tournament. They defeated Creighton in the regional finals and UCLA in the super regionals to advance to the College World Series for the first time since 1984. They became the first Big Ten Conference team to advance to the College World Series since Indiana in 2013, and the first Big Ten Conference team to advance to the championship round in the College World Series since Ohio State in 1966.

Previous season
The Wolverines finished the 2018 NCAA Division I baseball season 33–21 overall, including 15–8 in conference play, finishing in third place in their conference. Following the conclusion of the regular season, the Wolverines qualified to play in the 2018 Big Ten Conference baseball tournament. The Wolverines would eventually lose in the second round of the Big Ten Tournament to Ohio State by a score of 3–5.

Preseason
Michigan was the only Big Ten Conference team to appear in every national preseason top-25 ranking. The Wolverines were ranked No. 17 by D1Baseball, No. 20 by Baseball America, No. 23 by NCBWA and No. 25 by ESPN/USA Today Coaches Poll in their respective preseason polls.

Roster

Schedule

Rankings

Awards and honors

Major League Baseball Draft
The following Wolverines were selected in the 2019 Major League Baseball draft:

References

Michigan
Michigan
Michigan Wolverines
College World Series seasons
Michigan Wolverines baseball seasons